Cavanakeeran (Irish: Cabhan an Chaorthainn (Hill of the rowan tree).) is a townland in County Tyrone, Northern Ireland. It is situated in the historic barony of Dungannon Middle and the civil parish of Pomeroy and covers an area of 894 acres. The town of Pomeroy itself is situated in Cavanakeeran.

The area comprising Cavanakeeran is countryside with an agricultural population largely involved in raising livestock. One main feature is the Church of the Assumption situated in Pomeroy. Cavanakeeran is bordered by Limehill and Gortnagarn.

The population of the townland declined during the 19th century:

In 1891, the town of Pomeroy which stands in Cavanakeeran townland, was estimated to have an area of 21 acres.

See also 
List of townlands of County Tyrone
Pomeroy, County Tyrone

References 

Pomeroy Parish Directory

Townlands of County Tyrone
Barony of Dungannon Middle